El Espinal is a corregimiento in Guararé District, Los Santos Province, Panama with a population of 1,243 as of 2010. Its population as of 1990 was 1,117; its population as of 2000 was 1,206.

References

Corregimientos of Los Santos Province